"Tamang Panahon" is a special episode of Eat Bulaga! as well as the 87th episode of its "Kalyeserye" portion. The episode is also a benefit concert that was aired lived on television in the Philippines and other countries on October 24, 2015 from the Philippine Arena without any commercial breaks. "Tamang Panahon" highlighted the no-restrictions meeting of the AlDub love team of Alden Richards and Maine Mendoza.

The episode garnered a 50.8% rating in Mega Manila, 43% NUTAM (National Urban TV Audience Measurement) Household rating, 21.6% NUTAM People's Rating, and 40.1% Nationwide Rating beating its closest competition's 6th anniversary by ten, six, and four times according to AGB Nielsen and Kantar Media, respectively.  The Twitter hashtag #AlDubEBTamangPanahon was recognized by the Guinness Book of World Records as the most used hashtag in twenty four hours.  The hashtag generated a total of 40,706,392 tweets from October 24 to 25, 2015.

"Kalyeserye" plot 
Lola Nidora (Wally Bayola) announces that she will allow a no-restrictions policy during Alden (Alden Richards) and Yaya Dub (Maine Mendoza) meetings as long as they trust each other for the sake of love. After the announcement, Lola Nidora together with her two other sisters: Lola Tidora (Paolo Ballesteros) and Lola Tinidora (Jose Manalo) reminisce about their younger years.

Back at the mansion of the three Lolas, Lola Nidora received a mystery call telling her that the Riding in Tandem, who holds the secret diary, was on the way to the bungalow (the Philippine Arena) to ruin the show. Meanwhile, Alden is making his way to the bungalow of Lola Nidora.

In the bungalow, Lola Nidora recollects about her past relationships. She begins with Alberto, moving on to Antonio, then Ferdinand, and finally Anselmo, whom Lola Nidora had carried away with him. However, her mother was not in favor of Anselmo, until she had met Miguel de Explorer, whom Lola Nidora really loves. Lola Nidora continues her story explaining the family tree of the de Explorer clan. Suddenly, DuhRizz arrives and she says that she really loves Alden but hates Yaya Dub but she later apologizes about her mistakes to them. Rihanna enters the scene and she calls her chat mate Harry, but Lola Nidora orders Rihanna to get the juice for her and DuhRizz.  Lola Nidora tells DuhRizz that she can still find her true love, regardless of her social status, her beauty or her education background, and then calls Yaya Dub, who arrives along with Bae-by Baste and Yaya Luvs.

Alden finally arrives, bringing a box of roses and a box containing a missing glass slipper. Alden slowly enters and finally comes face-to-face with Yaya Dub. Lola Nidora enters the scene and lectures the couple about true love that waits for the right time and later proclaims that this is the right time for them. Then, the couple hugs Lola Nidora. Both Alden and Yaya Dub deliver their messages together. Lola Tidora and Lola Tinidora arrive and tell the couple to have their first dance together, but before their dance, Alden puts the missing slipper on the foot of Yaya Dub.

Afterwards, the Riding in Tandem arrives in the scene and Alden chases them to the car park. Suddenly, Frankie Arenolli arrives, wearing an outfit filled with logos of known sponsors of the event, while Yaya Dub and Alden run away.  Frankie delivers a short speech and claims that Yaya Dub should have become his wife.  As the show almost come to a close, Lola Tidora notices that Lola Nidora is missing.  Lola Nidora and the Rogelios are at the car park, fighting off the Riding In Tandem and Nidora successfully retrieves her secret diary from one of the riders.

Production and airing 
During the October 17, 2015 episode of "Kalyeserye", Wally Bayola through his Lola Nidora character announced that the AlDub love team will meet at Philippine Arena with no restrictions on October 24, 2015.  He further explained that the special event, which Lola Nidora called "Tamang Panahon" (or Right Time), was for a cause and 100% of the ticket sales would go to the construction of AlDub libraries that would benefit three elementary schools.

In just minutes after the availability of the tickets for "Tamang Panahon" event was announced, the website of the ticket provider, TicketWorld, crashed according to the posts of some netizens,   Three hours later, TicketWorld said that ticket sales for the "Tamang Panahon" benefit concert broke records for first day sales and the only available tickets are for the Level 4 prize zone.  After three days, all tickets were sold out.

On October 24, 2015, attendees were allowed to enter the venue, the Philippine Arena, at 6:00 am.  There has been a pre-show at the venue that started at 10:00 am, which includes front act performances and other activities  that were hosted by Valeen Montenegro and Jerald Napoles.  At 11:30 am, "Tamang Panahon" was shown live via GMA Network in the Philippines and was also beamed live via satellite in other countries such as the United States, Canada, and New Zealand.  The live broadcast lasted for about three and half hours without any commercial breaks.  This Eat Bulaga! special episode is also the 87th episode of its "Kalyeserye" segment.

"Tamang Panahon," being an Eat Bulaga! episode, is produced by TAPE Inc. with Antonio P. Tuviera as its producer and Malou Choa-Fagar as the overall in-charge of production. It was directed by Poochie Rivera with all the regular crew and production team of Eat Bulaga! including Jenny Ferre as its creative head. This event was hosted by its regular hosts, which headlined by Tito Sotto, Vic Sotto, and Joey de Leon.  The rest of the hosts were Ryan Agoncillo, Michael V., Allan K., Keempee de Leon, Jimmy Santos, Anjo Yllana, Pauleen Luna, Julia Clarete, Sam YG, Patricia Tumulak, Jose Manalo, Wally Bayola, Paolo Ballesteros, Alden Richards, Maine Mendoza, Ryzza Mae Dizon, and Baste Granfon.

Performances 
The show started with Wally Bayola's Lola Nidora character entering the premises of the Philippine Arena through a helicopter.  After entering the venue, Lola Nidora together with her Rogelios danced through the tune of Dawin's "Dessert";  Lola Tidora (Paolo Ballesteros) performed the songs from Mariah Carey and Regine Velasquez while Lola Tinidora also danced to "Mambo No. 5" by Lou Bega.

The next dance number was performed by Pauleen Luna, Patricia Tumulak, and Julia Clarete.  In their The Great Gatsby inspired performance, they played the younger versions of Nidora, Tidora, and Tinidora.  Later in the show, musical artists sang AlDub theme songs.  Those singers were Raymund Sarangay of Silent Sanctuary who sang "Sa 'Yo", Medwin Marfil of True Faith who sang "Dahil Ikaw", Jireh Lim who sang "Buko", Joey Generoso of Side A who sang "Forevermore", and Tito Sotto, Vic Sotto, and Joey de Leon who sang "Ngiti", a Ronnie Liang original.

Before the highlight of the event, Maine Mendoza danced to Big Bang's "Fantastic Baby", which was followed by a dance number by Ryzza Mae Dizon and then another dance number by Baste who danced to Psy's "Gentleman".  After a series of videos presenting Mendoza's rise to fame, Mendoza performed an instrumental dance to the tune of Selena's "Dreaming of You".  Later on, the highlight of the event, the meeting of Alden Richards and Yaya Dub (the character of Maine Mendoza), followed as they performed Ed Sheeran's "Thinking Out Loud" and Bryan White's "God Gave Me You".  Yaya Dub who usually lip synced songs and film lines and did not actually speak in the previous episodes of the "Kalyeserye" segment spoke for the first time in this event.  At the end of the event, Alden and Yaya Dub danced together with other hosts of Eat Bulaga!

Aside from song and dance numbers, there were also "Kalyeserye" skits, which included the switching portrayals of Wally Bayola's characters namely Lola Nidora, DuhRizz, and Rihanna.  Frankie Arenolli, one of Jose Manalo's character, performed a dance number at the very end of the show where his outfit was filled with logos of advertisers.  It served as product placement in lieu of the no commercial break rule of the show.

Fundraising 
"Tamang Panahon" is not only a special episode of Eat Bulaga! but also a benefit concert. It was intended to raise funds for the construction of AlDub libraries that benefited schools and Lumads.  All the ticket sales of the event were allotted to charity.  Tickets were already sold out after three days of the announcement of its availability according to TicketWorld, the handler for selling the tickets of the event.

Other people who were not able to buy tickets still donated for the cause.  After the first production number of the event, it was made public that the benefit show raised .  Two months after the event was aired, some of the AlDub libraries were already fully constructed in the schools at Laguna, Capiz, and Iligan City.  In October 2016, Maine Mendoza herself turned over the AlDub library project to one of the beneficiaries in Cebu.

Reception

Ratings 
The "Tamang Panahon" episode of Eat Bulaga! obtained a 50.8% rating in Mega Manila and 42.9% rating in urban areas in the Philippines (as measured by NUTAM or Nationwide Urban Television Audience Measurement) making it as the highest rated single episode for 2015 according to AGB Nielsen.  In the Kantar Media ratings, the special Eat Bulaga! episode garnered a 40.1% rating beating ABS-CBN's It's Showtime (its closest competition) by about four times, making it the highest rated daytime show for 2015 in the Philippine television.

Reactions 
Some netizens criticized the gown worn by Maine Mendoza during the event, pointing out that it had already been worn by actress Kim Chiu previously.  Liz Uy of Stylized Studio who was hired as wardrobe stylist for the show made a statement regarding the gown. She argued that the producers of Eat Bulaga!, TAPE Inc., purchased the gown from Francis Libiran and had chosen it to fit the Cinderella-themed event.  Libiran also commented on the issue and said that Chiu had worn the gown in a 2013 fashion show but the one that Mendoza wore was a different albeit with the same design.

Kim Chiu herself appealed through Twitter to stop the hate and the "gown is just a gown."  Eat Bulaga! host Allan K also pleaded on Twitter and said that do not put an issue on the gown since Libiran already released a statement about the history of the gown.

Accolades and features 
According to the Guinness World Records, the "Tamang Panahon" hashtag #AlDubEBTamangPanahon became the most used hashtag in 24 hours on Twitter, generating 40,706,392 mentions from October 24 to 25, 2015. The recognition was part of the record-breaking feats of Twitter's 10-year history. The most retweeted tweet for the event came from a post from the official Twitter account of Maine Mendoza, which was retweeted more than 74,000 times.

"Tamang Panahon" received a special award during the 2016 Box Office Entertainment Awards as the Highest Record Rating of a Noontime Show of All Time (Local & Global).  The event was also featured in a special collectors edition of the December 2015 issue of Yes! magazine.

Notes

References

External links 

Eat Bulaga!
2015 in Philippine television
Benefit concerts in the Philippines
GMA Network television specials
Entertainment events in the Philippines
2015 television specials
Philippine television specials